The 1981–82 Inter Milan season was Football Club Internazionale Milano's 73rd in existence and 66th consecutive season in the top flight of Italian football.

Season 
The 1981–82 season saw Inter win the Coppa Italia, the second in four years and the third overall. The final opponent was Torino, which were beaten 1–0 in first leg and drew 1–1 in the second. Inter showed some new faces, such as the young Giuseppe Bergomi and Riccardo Ferri (both born in 1963), Salvatore Bagni and Aldo Serena, who returned after several loans.

Inter also reached the round of 32 in UEFA Cup - giving up in front of Dinamo Bucharest during overtime - and achieved fifth place in the domestic league, but the triumph in the Coppa Italia resulted in a qualification for the UEFA Cup Winners' Cup.

Squad 
Source: 

Date of birth and role are between brackets.

Competitions

Serie A

League table

Matches

Coppa Italia 

First Round

Quarterfinals

Semifinals

Final

First leg

Second leg

UEFA Cup 

First round

Round of 32

Statistics

Players statistics

See also
 History of Inter Milan
 List of Inter Milan seasons

References

Sources
 RSSSF Italy 1981/82

Inter Milan seasons
Inter Milan